Sai Kham Leik, is a successful and prolific Burmese songwriter. Said to be a physician by training he is an ethnic Shan songwriter and has written more than 500 songs in Burmese, 200 in Shan and about 35 in English. 

His father, Kham Ka, was a noted poet and a former chief minister of Hsenwi Palace. He was born on 27 April 1949 in Hsenwi. He has three siblings. He married Dr. Nwe Nwe Tin in 1971 and has four children. He is also a persistence promoter of Shan culture. He is vital composer of late Sai Htee Saing, a well-known Shan singer of Myanmar. They met in 1969 and later they founded a music band which became a successful The Wild Ones. "Panglong Agreement" is his most cerebrated song among Shan since 1971. It was sung by Sai Hsai Mao and recorded in Thailand in 1974 with the financial support of a renounced Wa leader.

References

External links
 Photo of Sai Kham Leik
 Interview with Win Nyein

1949 births
Living people
Burmese composers
Burmese physicians
People from Shan State
University of Medicine, Mandalay alumni
Burmese people of Shan descent